Song of the Land is a 1953 American documentary film directed by Henry S. Kesler and written by Joseph Henry Steele. The film was released on November 17, 1953, by United Artists.

Synopsis

References

External links 
 

1953 films
1953 documentary films
United Artists films
American documentary films
1950s English-language films
1950s American films